Miłkowice may refer to:

Miłkowice, Lower Silesian Voivodeship (south-west Poland)
Miłkowice, Greater Poland Voivodeship (west-central Poland)